The Hughes 31 is a Canadian sailboat that was designed by Sparkman & Stephens as a cruiser and first built in 1979. It is a version of Sparkman & Stephens's design number 2098.

The Hughes 31 is a development of the North Star 1000.

Production
The design was built by Hughes Boat Works in Canada, starting in 1979, but it is now out of production.

Design
The Hughes 31 was derived from the Sparkman & Stephens' North Star 1000 design by extending the transom and increasing the beam, plus redesigning a larger coach house roof to give increased cabin interior volume for cruising.

The design is a recreational keelboat, built predominantly of fibreglass, with wood trim. It has a masthead sloop rig, a reverse transom, a skeg-mounted rudder and a fixed fin keel. It displaces  and carries  of ballast.

The boat is fitted with an OMC Saildrive gasoline engine or an optional Japanese Yanmar 2GM diesel engine for docking and manoeuvring.

The design has sleeping accommodation for six people, with a double "V"-berth in the bow cabin, a fold-out double settee and a single straight settee in the main cabin and an aft quarter berth on the starboard side. The galley is located on the port side just forward of the companionway ladder. The galley is "L"-shaped and is equipped with a two-burner stove, icebox and a sink. A navigation station is opposite the galley, on the starboard side. The head is located just aft of the bow cabin on the port side.

Operational history
In a 1999 review in Canadian Yachting Pat Sturgeon wrote, "I always describe the Hughes 31 as a boat that gives "good bang for the buck" and the main saloon plays a big part in this evaluation. The table is all teak and folds up on the port bulkhead. This makes the main area of the boat very roomy. The cushions are made with four-inch-thick foam and the settees are quite comfortable. The location and layout of the galley make it appear to be an extension of the main cabin and the quarter berth - another feature that makes the Hughes 31 feel very spacious. If you have guests on board, the port-side settee can be turned into a double bed, bringing the total number of available sleeping spaces to six."

See also
List of sailing boat types

References

Keelboats
1970s sailboat type designs
Sailing yachts
Sailboat type designs by Sparkman and Stephens
Sailboat types built by Hughes Boat Works